The Tympylykan (Tımpılıkaan) is a river in the Sakha Republic (Yakutia), Russia. It is a left tributary of the Lena.

The basin of the Tympylykan falls fully within the Central Yakutian Lowland. It flows across the Kobyaysky and Vilyuysky districts. The banks of the river are uninhabited.

Geography
The Tympylykan originates in an area of swamps and small lakes of the Central Yakutian Lowland. It flows first in a SSE direction and then roughly southeastwards to the south of the Linde within a wide floodplain. Towards the last stretch of its course it bends and flows northeastwards, meandering among marshes and lakes. The Lyapiske has its mouth roughly on the opposite side of the Lena.

See also
List of rivers of Russia

References

External links
Fishing & Tourism in Yakutia
Rivers of the Sakha Republic
Central Yakutian Lowland